Nelson Appleton Miles (August 8, 1839 – May 15, 1925) was an American military general who served in the American Civil War, the American Indian Wars, and the Spanish–American War. 

From 1895 to 1903, Miles served as the last Commanding General of the United States Army, before the office was retooled as Chief of Staff of the Army.

Early life
Miles was born in Westminster, Massachusetts, on his family's farm. He worked in Boston, read military history, and mastered military principles and techniques, including battle drills. He attended Fort Wayne College.

Civil War

Miles was working as a crockery store clerk in Boston when the American Civil War began. He entered the Union Army as a volunteer on September 9, 1861, and fought in many crucial battles. He became a lieutenant in the 22nd Regiment Massachusetts Volunteer Infantry and was commissioned a lieutenant colonel of the 61st New York Volunteer Infantry Regiment on May 31, 1862. He was promoted to colonel after the Battle of Antietam.

Other battles he participated in include Fredericksburg, Chancellorsville (during which he was shot in the neck and abdomen), and the Appomattox Campaign. Wounded four times in battle, on March 2, 1867, Miles was brevetted a brigadier general in the regular army in recognition of his actions at Chancellorsville. He was again brevetted, this time to the rank of major general, for his actions at the Battle of Spotsylvania Court House. He received the Medal of Honor on July 23, 1892, for his gallantry at Chancellorsville. He was appointed brigadier-general of volunteers as of May 12, 1864, for the Battles of the Wilderness and Spotsylvania Court House. On October 21, 1865, he was appointed a major general of volunteers at the age of 26. After the war, he was commandant of Fort Monroe, Virginia, where former Confederate President Jefferson Davis was held prisoner. During his tenure at Fort Monroe, Miles was forced to defend himself against charges that Davis was being mistreated.

Indian Wars

In July 1866, Miles was appointed a colonel in the Regular Army. In April 1867 he was appointed assistant commissioner of the North Carolina Bureau of Refugees, Freedmen, and Abandoned Lands, serving under bureau commissioner Brigadier General Oliver O. Howard. On June 30, 1868, he married Mary Hoyt Sherman (daughter of Charles Taylor Sherman, niece of William T. Sherman and John Sherman, and granddaughter of Charles R. Sherman). In March 1869, he became commander of the 5th U.S. Infantry Regiment, a position he held until 1880.

Miles played a leading role in nearly all of the U.S. Army's campaigns against the American Indian tribes of the Great Plains, among whom he was known as "Bearcoat" (for his characteristic bearskin coat). In 1874–1875, he was a field commander in the force that defeated the Kiowa, Comanche, and the Southern Cheyenne along the Red River. Between 1876 and 1877, he participated in the campaign that scoured the Northern Plains after Lt. Col. George Armstrong Custer's defeat at the Battle of the Little Big Horn and forced the Lakota and their allies onto reservations. In the winter of 1877, he drove his troops on a forced march across eastern Montana to intercept the Nez Perce band led by Chief Joseph after the Nez Perce War. For the rest of his career, Miles would quarrel with General Oliver O. Howard over credit for Joseph's capture.

While on the Yellowstone, he developed expertise with the heliograph for sending communications signals, establishing a  line of heliographs connecting Fort Keogh and Fort Custer, Montana, in 1878. The heliographs were supplied by Brig. Gen. Albert J. Myer of the Signal Corps.

In December 1880, Miles was promoted to brigadier general in the Regular Army. He was then assigned to command the Department of the Columbia (1881–85) and the Department of Missouri (1885–86). In 1886, Miles replaced General George Crook as commander of forces fighting against Geronimo, a Chiricahua Apache leader, in the Department of Arizona. Crook had relied heavily on Apache scouts in his efforts to capture Geronimo. Instead, Miles relied on white troops, who eventually traveled  without success as they tracked Geronimo through the tortuous Sierra Madre Mountains. Finally, First Lieutenant Charles B. Gatewood, who had studied Apache ways, succeeded in negotiating a surrender, under the terms of which Geronimo and his followers agreed to spend two years on a Florida reservation. Geronimo agreed on these terms, being unaware of the real plot behind the negotiations (that there was no intent to let them go back to their native lands). The exile included even the Chiricahuas who had worked for the army, in violation of Miles' agreement with them. Miles denied Gatewood any credit for the negotiations and had him transferred to the Dakota Territory. During this campaign, Miles's special signals unit used the heliograph extensively, proving its worth in the field. The special signals unit was under the command of Captain W.A. Glassford. In 1888, Miles became the commander of the Military Division of the Pacific and the Department of California.

In April 1890, Miles was promoted to major general in the Regular Army and became the commander of the Military Division of the Missouri. That same year, the last major resistance of the Sioux on the Lakota reservations, known as the Ghost Dance, brought Miles back into the field. He commanded U.S. Army forces on the Lakota lands and hoped to take a peaceful approach to removing the Hunkpapa leader from the reservation, but Sitting Bull was killed in an attempt to arrest him and about 300 Sioux were massacred at Wounded Knee. Miles was not directly involved at Wounded Knee and was critical of the commanding officer, James W. Forsyth. Just two days after the event, Miles wrote to his wife, describing Wounded Knee as "the most abominable criminal military blunder and a horrible massacre of women and children". After his retirement from the army, he fought for compensation payments to the survivors of the massacre. Overall, he believed that the United States should have authority over the Indians, with the Lakota under military control.

Spanish–American War and later life

In his capacity as commander of the Department of the East from 1894 to 1895, Miles commanded the troops mobilized to put down the Pullman strike riots. He was named Commanding General of the United States Army in 1895, a post he held during the Spanish–American War. Miles commanded forces at Cuban sites such as Siboney.

After the surrender of Santiago de Cuba by the Spanish, he led the invasion of Puerto Rico, landing in Guánica in what is known as the Puerto Rican Campaign. He served as the first head of the military government established on the island, acting as both heads of the army of occupation and administrator of civil affairs. Upon returning to the United States, Miles was a vocal critic of the Army's quartermaster general, Brigadier General Charles P. Eagan, for providing rancid canned meat to troops in the field during what was known as the Army beef scandal. He was promoted to the rank of lieutenant general in 1900 based on his performance in the war.

The distance was covered on a relay of horses stationed at 10-mile intervals; the first 30 miles were covered in 2 hours, 25 minutes. This was the longest horseback ride ever made by a commanding general of the army.

Called a "brave peacock" by President Theodore Roosevelt, Miles nevertheless retired from the army in 1903 upon reaching the mandatory retirement age of 64. Upon his retirement, the office of Commanding General of the United States Army was abolished by an Act of Congress and the Army Chief of Staff system was introduced. A year later, standing as a presidential candidate at the Democratic National Convention, he received a handful of votes. The Prohibition Party was going to give him their nomination, but an hour before balloting he sent a telegram to the convention stating that he did not want the nomination which went to Silas C. Swallow instead. When the United States entered World War I in 1917, the 77-year-old general offered to serve, but President Woodrow Wilson turned him down.

Miles died in 1925 at the age of 85 from a heart attack while attending the Ringling Bros. and Barnum & Bailey Circus in Washington, D.C. with his grandchildren. First Lady Grace Coolidge was also in attendance at the circus that day, and upon arriving at the showgrounds the general told circus owner John Ringling that he never missed a circus. Nelson was one of the last surviving general officers who served during the Civil War on either side. He is buried at Arlington National Cemetery in the Miles Mausoleum. It is one of only two mausoleums within the confines of the cemetery. George Burroughs Torrey painted his portrait.

Military awards

 Medal of Honor
 Civil War Campaign Medal
 Indian Campaign Medal
 Spanish Campaign Medal
 Army of Puerto Rican Occupation Medal

Medal of Honor citation

Rank and Organization:
Colonel, 61st New York Infantry. Place and date: At Chancellorsville, Va., May 3, 1863. Entered service at: Roxbury, Mass. Birth: Westminster, Mass. Date of issue: July 23, 1892.

Citation:
Distinguished gallantry while holding with his command an advanced position against repeated assaults by a strong force of the enemy; was severely wounded.

Memberships
General Miles was a member of several hereditary and military societies, including the Military Order of the Loyal Legion of the United States (MOLLUS), serving as Commander-in-Chief from 1919 to 1925, the Grand Army of the Republic, Sons of the American Revolution and the Military Order of Foreign Wars. He was also an honorary member of the Massachusetts Society of the Cincinnati.

Legacy

Miles City, Montana is named in his honor, as is Miles Street and the Miles Neighborhood in Tucson, Arizona. Miles Canyon on the Yukon River near Whitehorse, Yukon, was named after him in 1883 by Lt. Frederick Schwatka during his exploration of the river system. A steamship, General Miles, was likely named for him. Nelson M. Holderman, himself a Medal of Honor recipient, was also named after Miles. Fort Miles at Cape Henlopen near Lewes, Delaware, was named for Miles 3 June, 1941. See Wikipedia article on Fort Miles.  

Miles' legacy as an Indian fighter has seen him portrayed by Kevin Tighe in the film Geronimo: An American Legend, by Hugh O'Brian in the film Gunsmoke: The Last Apache, and by Shaun Johnston in the film adaptation of Bury My Heart at Wounded Knee. There is a bust of General Miles in the Massachusetts State Capitol in Boston. General Miles' son, Sherman Miles, was a career Army officer who graduated from West Point in 1905 and rose to the rank of major general during World War II. His daughter Cecelia was the wife of Colonel Samuel Reber II, and the mother of Samuel Reber III.

Dates of rank

See also

 List of Medal of Honor recipients
 List of American Civil War Medal of Honor recipients: M–P
 List of American Civil War generals (Union)
 List of Massachusetts generals in the American Civil War

Notes

References
 DeMontravel, Peter R. A Hero to His Fighting Men, Nelson A. Miles, 1839–1925. Kent, OH: The Kent State University Press, 1998. .
 Eicher, John H., and David J. Eicher. Civil War High Commands. Stanford, CA: Stanford University Press, 2001. .
 Miles, Nelson Appleton. Personal Recollections and Observations of General Nelson A. Miles. Chicago: Werner Co., 1896. .
 Warner, Ezra J. Generals in Blue: Lives of the Union Commanders. Baton Rouge: Louisiana State University Press, 1964. .
 Greene, Jerome. American Carnage: Wounded Knee, 1890. University of Oklahoma Press, 2014.

Further reading
 Freidel, Frank. The Splendid Little War. Short Hills, NJ: Burford Books, 1958. .
 Greene, Jerome A. Yellowstone Command: Colonel Nelson A. Miles and the Great Sioux War, 1876–1877. Norman: University of Oklahoma Press, 2006, 1991.

External links
 
 
 Commanding Generals and Chiefs of Staff
 Nelson A. Miles Collection US Army Heritage and Education Center, Carlisle, Pennsylvania
 David Leighton, "Tucson Street Smarts: Miles Street named for famed general," Arizona Daily Star, March 19, 2013
 
Guide to the Nelson Appleton Miles Collection 1886 at the University of Chicago Special Collections Research Center

1839 births
1925 deaths
People from Westminster, Massachusetts
United States Army Medal of Honor recipients
People of the Great Sioux War of 1876
Burials at Arlington National Cemetery
Comanche campaign
People of Massachusetts in the American Civil War
Nez Perce War
American military personnel of the Spanish–American War
Union Army generals
American military personnel of the Indian Wars
Apache Wars
Pine Ridge Campaign
American Civil War recipients of the Medal of Honor
Washington, D.C., Democrats
Sons of the American Revolution
Commanding Generals of the United States Army
Massachusetts Democrats
Military personnel from Massachusetts